Buttiauxella is a Gram-negative, aerobic, facultative anaerobic and motile genus of bacteria within the family of Enterobacteriaceae.

References

Further reading 
 
 
 
 

Enterobacteriaceae
Bacteria genera